Take Me to Hollywood (Spanish:Yo quiero que me lleven a Hollywood) is a 1931 Spanish comedy film directed by Edgar Neville, starring Perlita Greco. It was one of the earliest Spanish sound films.

References

Bibliography
 Labanyi, Jo & Pavlović, Tatjana. A Companion to Spanish Cinema. John Wiley & Sons, 2012.

External links

1931 films
Spanish comedy films
1931 comedy films
1930s Spanish-language films
Films directed by Edgar Neville
Spanish black-and-white films